Ningshan County is a county in the south of Shaanxi province, China. It is the northernmost county-level division of Ankang City.

Administrative divisions
As 2019, Ningshan County is divided to 11 towns.
Towns (镇; zhèn)

Climate

Transport 

 China National Highway 210
 China National Highway 345
 G5 Beijing–Kunming Expressway

References

County-level divisions of Shaanxi
Ankang